Soňa Brázdová (born 17 February 1953) is a Czech gymnast. She competed in six events at the 1972 Summer Olympics.

References

1953 births
Living people
Czech female artistic gymnasts
Olympic gymnasts of Czechoslovakia
Gymnasts at the 1972 Summer Olympics
Sportspeople from Zlín